Szklary  is a village in the administrative district of Gmina Ząbkowice Śląskie, within Ząbkowice Śląskie County, Lower Silesian Voivodeship, in south-western Poland.

The only nickel ore mine in Poland was located here until 1984 when it was closed due to the depletion of the deposits. There was also a nickel foundry for processing mined ore. Excellent samples of chrysoprase were found in Szklary. Quite recently, a new mineral szklaryite was named after the village.

References

Villages in Ząbkowice Śląskie County